
La Sarca Lake is a lake in the Beni Department, Bolivia. At an elevation of 136 m, its surface area is 26 km².

Lakes of Beni Department